The Petroleum Production Company Nobel Brothers, Limited, or Branobel (short for братьев Нобель "brat'yev Nobel" — "Nobel Brothers" in Russian), was an oil company set up by Ludvig Nobel and Baron Peter von Bilderling. It operated mainly in Baku, Azerbaijan, but also in Cheleken, Turkmenistan.
Originally established by Robert Nobel (who contributed 25,000 rubles) and the investments of barons Peter von Bilderling (300,000 rubles) and Standertskjöld (150,000 rubles) as a distillery in 1876, it became, during the late-19th century, one of the largest oil-companies in the world.

History

The Nobel Brothers Petroleum Company was an oil-producing company that had its origins in a distillery, founded by Robert and Ludvig Nobel in Baku in 1876, which, in 1879, turned into a shareholding company headquartered in St. Petersburg. The share capital of three million rubles was divided as follows: 53,7% Ludwig Nobel, 31,0% Baron Peter von Bilderling,  4,7% I.J. Zabelskiv, 3,8% Alfred Nobel, 3,3% Robert Nobel, 1,7% au Baron Alexandre von Bilderling. Pipeline transport was pioneered near Baku by Vladimir Shukhov and the Branobel company in 1878–1880. On 10 April 1902, the company signed a contract for the purchase of oil fields in Romany, which were owned by the oil producer Isabey Hajinsky. On 17 October 1905, in accordance with the Committee of Ministers, the company purchased the oil fields owned by oil producer A. Adamov. The company's fixed capital in 1914–1917 was 30 million rubles. By 1916, it was the largest oil company in Russia, producing 76 million poods of oil.

Between 1877 and 1901, the company drilled over 500 wells, produced 150 million barrels of oil, and employed 12,000 workers.

Challenges

In 1912, the Russian General Oil Corporation was founded in London as an English holding company and united some 20 of the most important Russian and foreign banks. These included: 
A.I. Mantashev & Co.
G.M. Lianozov Sons
Moscow-Caucasus Trade Company
Caspian Partnership
Russian Petroleum Society
Absheron Petroleum Society

By 1914, the fixed capital in oil was more than 120 million rubles. The Russian General Oil Corporation, buying a considerable number of shares in the Berlin Exchange, attempted to take control of Branobel. The move failed and by 1916 Emanuel Nobel had bought not only a considerable share in the Russian General Oil Corporation, but had also established control over other oil businesses in the region, such as Volga-Baku Company, A.I. Mantashev & Co., the Anglo-Russian Maximov Oil Company in London and G.M. Lianozov Sons, of which he personally owned a third.

About 12% of the money left to establish the Nobel Prizes by Alfred Nobel came from his shares in the company; he was its largest individual investor.

The Russian Revolution and Branobel
On 28 April 1920, the Bolsheviks seized power in Baku after the Red Army invasion of Azerbaijan and Branobel's oil business in Azerbaijan was nationalized. In May 1920, the Nobel family sold almost half the Branobel's shares in its possession to Standard Oil of New Jersey. At the time it was considered uncertain whether the Bolshevik regime would last and the negotiation led by Gustaf Nobel, on one side, and Walter C. Teagle, on the other, proved to be a profitable masterstroke for the Nobel family.

Branobel was formally dissolved in 1959 and its last President was Nils Nobel-Oleinikoff, son of Marta Nobel-Oleinikoff and grandson of Ludvig Nobel.

Photogallery
 More photos can be found at Tekniska museet in Stockholm, Sweden.

Gallery

See also

Petroleum industry in Azerbaijan

References

 Tolf, Robert, The Russian Rockefellers (Stanford, 1976)
 Yergin, Daniel (2003): The Prize: the Epic Quest for Oil, Money and Power, Free Press, p. 58. 
 Åsbrink, Brita (2001): Ludvig Nobel: "Petroleum har en lysande framtid!" Wahlström & Widstrand, p. 19. 
 Mir-Babayev M.F. The role of Azerbaijan in the World's oil industry – “Oil-Industry History” (USA), 2011, v. 12, no. 1, p. 109-123.
 Mir-Babayev M.F. and Atabeyli B. The unknown Nobel Prize in Baku - “Oil-Industry History” (USA), 2013, v. 14, no. 1, p. 117-124.

External links

 The Nobels and Baku Oil 
 Azerbaijan's Oil History
 First pipelines Branobel company
 
 The Tsaritsyn Heritage of the Nobel Brothers
 The Branobel History Project

Defunct oil companies of Russia
Oil and gas companies of Azerbaijan
Energy companies established in 1876
Non-renewable resource companies established in 1876
Non-renewable resource companies disestablished in 1959
Defunct oil companies
Nobel family
1876 establishments in the Russian Empire
Defunct energy companies of the Soviet Union